Jiblah is a town in south-western Yemen,  south, south-west of Ibb in the governorate of the same name. The town and its surroundings were added to the UNESCO World Heritage Tentative List due to its purported universal cultural value. The historical Palace of Queen Arwa is located in the town.

History 

Following the assassination of the Sulayhid 'Ali ibn Muhammad in 1067 CE, Arwa al-Sulayhi's husband Ahmad became the de jure ruler of Yemen, but he was unable to rule, being paralysed and bedridden. He gave all of his power to Arwa, one of her first actions was to move the capital from Sana'a to Jibla, in order to be in a better position to destroy Sa'id ibn Najar, and thus avenge her father-in-law's death. This she managed to do by luring him into a trap in 1088. She built a new palace at Jibla, and transformed the old palace into a great mosque where she was eventually buried.

Rural life of villagers 
As late as 1979, the women of Jibla would launder their clothes in large pools formed by rivulets of natural spring water, which trickled down the slopes of Jebal Attaker. Stepping stones of the brook were used in place of scrub-boards.

Infrastructure

Health 
The American Baptist Hospital is located in Jibla. On December 30, 2002, an Islamist militant entered the hospital, and shot and killed three Southern Baptist hospital workers. The day after the shootings, ownership of the hospital was transferred to the Yemeni government. The government assumed responsibility in 2003, and continued to employ Southern Baptist workers, until its closing in May 2007.

As with other areas in war-torn Yemen, Jibla was affected by the COVID-19 pandemic, but its hospital lacked capabilities to test for the coronavirus, thus doctors there had to use other means to diagnose it. Yet according to two healthcare workers there, the hospital daily received almost 50 people with symptoms, and out of fear of reprisals, doctors did not inform relatives of deceased patients about them even being suspected to have contracted the virus.

Mosques 

There are two historical mosques here:
 Queen Arwa Mosque
 Qubbat Bayt Az-Zum Mosque, also known as Masjid Qubbat Ash-Shaykh Yaʿqūb Az-Zūm, which was established in 921 A.H.

References

External links 

 Ministry of Information of Yemen
 Travel Adventures 
 Yémen : Ibb, Jibla (YouTube)
 Yemen Jibla market
 مسجد قبة الزوم بمدينة جبلة باليمن - دراسة أثرية وثائقية (Arabic)

Jabal At-Ta'kar 
 جبل التعكر - اعلى جبل في اليمن
 جبل التعكر مدينة اب الخضراء
 جبل التعكر في وسط اليمن وعلاقته بسطيح الكاهن

Populated places in Ibb Governorate